The original Boston-Montreal-Boston (BMB) was as a 1200 km randonnée organized in 1988 by a group of cyclists, originally living in the Boston, Massachusetts (US) area. The ride started as an out-and-back course from Newton, Massachusetts (US), a suburb of Boston, to Saint-Lambert, Quebec (Canada), a suburb of Montreal, on the south shore of the St-Lawrence River. BMB was later taken over by ride organizer, Jennifer Wise, who modified the route, shifting the turn around point to Huntingdon, Quebec (Canada), to avoid the Montreal urban area. It was held every year from 1988 through 2006 except for Paris–Brest–Paris years.

BMB was sometimes regarded as the North American equivalent of Paris–Brest–Paris.

It was a noncompetitive endurance bike event.

References

External links
 BMB Boston-Montreal-Boston 1200k (USA)
 BMB Permanent ride 2011

Sports in Boston
Sport in Montreal
Cycling events in the United States
Cycling events in Canada